Logan Holt Roots (March 26, 1841 – May 30, 1893) was an American politician who served as the U.S. representative for  from 1868 to 1871. He was a member of the Republican Party. He is the namesake of Fort Logan H. Roots.

Early life and education
Roots was born in Perry County, Illinois. He completed preparatory studies and graduated in 1862 from Illinois State Normal University. He assisted in recruiting the 81st Illinois Infantry, in which he served until the close of the Civil War. Commissioned a first lieutenant, by the time of his discharge in 1865, he was breveted a lieutenant colonel. After the war, Roots settled in Arkansas to engage in planting and business.

Political career
Upon the readmission of Arkansas to the Union, Roots was elected as a Republican to the Fortieth Congress and reelected to the Forty-first Congress and served from June 22, 1868, to March 3, 1871. He was an unsuccessful candidate for reelection in 1870 to the Forty-second Congress. After his time as a U.S. Representative, Roots was appointed marshal for the U.S. District Court for the Western District of Arkansas. Political scandal led to his removal the following year.

Later life
In 1891, Roots was named the first president of the Arkansas Bankers Association. He served as president of the First National Bank of Little Rock until his death. He died at his home in Little Rock on May 30, 1893, and is interred there at Oakland Cemetery.

Notes

References

External links
 
 
 

1841 births
1893 deaths
19th-century American businesspeople
19th-century American politicians
American bankers
American planters
Businesspeople from Little Rock, Arkansas
Illinois State University alumni
Logan H. Roots
Military personnel from Illinois
People from Perry County, Illinois
People of Illinois in the American Civil War
Politicians from Little Rock, Arkansas
Republican Party members of the United States House of Representatives from Arkansas
Union Army officers